Me and My Guitar is the forty-eighth studio album by American guitarist Chet Atkins. It was nominated for the Best Country & Western Instrumental Performance Grammy in 1978. Atkins joined Floyd Cramer and Danny Davis that same year to produce Chet Floyd & Danny which was also nominated.

Lenny Breau appears on "Long, Long Ago" and "You'd Be So Nice to Come Home To".

Reissues 
 Me and My Guitar was reissued by One Way Records (35122) combined with First Nashville Guitar Quartet.

Track listing

Side one 
 "Cascade" (Gene Slone) – 2:23
 "West Memphis Serenade" (Bobby Braddock)– 2:35
 "Long, Long Ago" (Thomas Bayly) – 2:53
 "All Thumbs" (Mark Casstevens) – 2:20
 "Vincent (Don McLean) – 3:12
 "Me and My Guitar" (James Taylor) – 2:40

Side two 
 "Struttin'" (Jerry Reed) – 2:31
 "You'd Be So Nice to Come Home To" (Cole Porter) – 3:10
 "David's Dance" (Odell Martin) – 3:07
 "A Song for Anna" (Andre Popp) – 2:42
 "My Little Waltz" (Atkins, John Knowles) – 2:25

Personnel 
 Chet Atkins - guitar, resonator guitar, vocals
 Lenny Breau - guitar, bass
 John Baker - percussion
 Paul Yandell – guitar
 Mark Casstevens – guitar
 Larrie Londin – drums
 Hargus "Pig" Robbins – piano
 Randy Goodrum – clavinet, synthesizer, Utility keyboard
 Bob Moore – bass
 Henry Styzelecki – bass
 Ray Stevens – piano
 Bobby Wood – piano, organ
 Tommy Cogbill – bass
 Hayward Bishop – drums
 John Christopher – guitar
 Billy Sanford – guitar
 John Baker – drums
 Floyd Cramer – piano
 Dave Kirby – guitar
 Joe Osborn – bass
 Jimmy Isbell – drums
Production notes
 Engineered by Bill Vandervort, Bill Harris, Chuck Seitz, Al Pachucki
 Mastered by Randy King

References 

Chet Atkins albums
1977 albums
RCA Records albums